HD 220035 is variable star in the equatorial constellation of Aquarius.

References

External links
 Image HD 220035

Aquarius (constellation)
220035
K-type giants
8879
Suspected variables
115257
Durchmusterung objects